Picadillo ("mince") is a traditional dish in many Latin American countries and the Philippines. It is made with ground meat (most commonly beef), tomatoes (tomato sauce may be used as a substitute), and also raisins, olives, and other ingredients that vary by region. It is often served with rice (hence it is commonly known in the Philippines as arroz a la cubana, "Cuban-style rice") or used as a filling in dishes such as tacos, savory pastries or croquettes. The name comes from the Spanish word picar, meaning "to mince".

Picadillo can be eaten alone or incorporated into other dishes, like tacos, empanadas, pastelón, chiles en nogada, or alcapurrias.

History
Although the dish was common in Hispanic cultures before the 19th century, a 19th-century recipe from California for pasteles a la argentina is given for a filled pastry with layers of beef picadillo and chicken cooked in a green chili and onion sauce with olive oil and raisins. "Picadillo" was not always made with beef; "picadillo de ave" was a minced fowl with white sauce. Pasteles de pollos y pichones (chicken and squab pastry) was made as a savory pie with alternating layers of chicken and squab with a picadillo of minced veal, bacon, ham fried in lard with onion, mushrooms, apples, artichokes, tomatoes, and a layer of seasonings.

By region

Costa Rica
Costa Rican versions always include the name of the vegetable that represents the main ingredient to the dish (potato picadillo, ayote picadillo, etc.) and that is chopped and cooked with bell peppers, onions, stock, herbs and spices. It can include some type of protein but that is not essential. It is often served with tortillas or rice.

Cuba
Cuban versions include peppers, onions, garlic, oregano, cumin, tomato sauce, stock, olives, and on occasion potatoes, capers, and Spanish chorizo<ref>Bremzen, Anya Von "Picadillo a la Habanera" Paladares: Recipes inspired by the private restaurants of Cuba" (2017)  p. 248-249</ref> and is usually sauteed in olive oil and white wine, depending on the region. Cuban picadillo is served with black turtle beans and rice.

Dominican Republic
In the Dominican Republic it includes peppers, onions, cilantro, garlic, tomato paste, bouillon cube, and may include olives, capers, raisins, hard-boiled egg. It is served over rice or used as a filling for pasteles, empanadas, kibbeh, and cabbage rolls.

Puerto Rico
In Puerto Rico it is used as a filling for empanadas, alcapurria, piononos and other fritters. It can also be served with rice and beans. The ground meat is sauteed with annatto, diced ham, oregano, bay leaf, recaito, tomato sauce and on occasion cumin, cheese, raisins, beans, sweet peas, olives, capers, diced potatoe, other spices and herbs.

Philippines
In the Philippines, picadillo is a soupy dish traditionally made with ground beef and either potatoes or chayote. There are also drier versions of the dish. It is also called giniling. Cubans call picadillo arroz a la cubana. In Cuba, arroz a la cubana and picadillo are understood as separate dishes instead of the same, with the former being rice cooked in tomato sauce and served with egg and plantain. The Philippine version is similar to normal Latino picadillo usually made with raisins, tomato sauce and diced potatoes added, but without green olives and capers, and is often served with white rice, fried plantains (maduros in Spanish, saging na saba in Filipino) on the side, and a fried egg on top. Boiled eggs are also eaten with the dish.

Mexico

In Mexico, beef picadillo is a classic antojito'' of the national cuisine. The most basic and popular set of ingredients of picadillo in Mexico are ground beef, carrots and potatoes, all cooked in a tomato sauce made from blended tomatoes, garlic and onion, usually seasoned with salt, pepper, and cumin but its preparation and ingredients can vary slightly from one region to another. For example, a Mexican picadillo can also include squash or peas. Mexican picadillo is typically eaten with tortillas, tostadas or tortilla chips and usually accompanied with rice or beans. It can be used as filling for chiles rellenos, chiles en nogada, tamales or gorditas. Pork is also a popular meat to use for picadillo in Mexico, as well as a mixture of pork and beef.

See also
Sloppy Joe
List of Mexican dishes

References

Beef dishes
Chilean cuisine
Costa Rican cuisine
Cuban cuisine
Dominican Republic cuisine
Mexican cuisine
Philippine cuisine
Puerto Rican cuisine
Meat-based sauces
Food and drink in California
Tuna dishes
Olive dishes